The 2014 Scottish Open was the seventeenth grand prix badminton tournament of the 2014 BWF Grand Prix Gold and Grand Prix. The tournament was held in Emirates Arena, Glasgow, Scotland from 19 until 23 November 2014 and had a total purse of $50,000. This tournament supported by the Glasgow City Council, Event Scotland, and Yonex.

Men's singles

Seeds

  Eric Pang (first round)
  Henri Hurskainen (second round)
  Dieter Domke (withdrew)
  Ville Lang (champion)
  Andre Kurniawan Tedjono (third round)
  Rasmus Fladberg (withdrew)
  Anand Pawar (semifinals)
  Joachim Persson (third round)
 Emil Holst (quarterfinals)
 Wang Tzu-wei (final)
 Dmytro Zavadsky (semifinals)
 Lucas Corvee (first round)
 Petr Koukal (quarterfinals)
 Thomas Rouxel (third round)
 Raul Must (second round)
 Jan Frohlich (first round)

Finals

Women's singles

Seeds

  Kirsty Gilmour (semifinals)
  Beatriz Corrales (finals)
  Linda Zetchiri (quarterfinals)
  Karin Schnaase (quarterfinals)
  Kaori Imabeppu (withdrew)
  Sashina Vignes Waran (withdrew)
  Natalia Perminova (withdrew)
  Anna Thea Madsen (second round)

Finals

Men's doubles

Seeds

 Baptiste Careme / Ronan Labar (second round)
 Matijs Dierickx / Freek Golinski (second round)
 Max Schwenger / Josche Zurwonne (quarterfinals)
 Raphael Beck / Andreas Heinz (finals)
 Adrian Liu / Derrick Ng (quarterfinals)
 Mathias Christiansen / David Daugaard (champion)
 Laurent Constantin / Matthieu Lo Ying Ping (semifinals)
 Fabian Holzer / Mark Lamsfuss (quarterfinals)

Finals

Women's doubles

Seeds

 Gabriela Stoeva / Stefani Stoeva (Champiom) 
 Johanna Goliszewski / Carla Nelte (semifinals)
 Imogen Bankier / Kirsty Gilmour (semifinals)
 Alex Bruce / Phyllis Chan (second round)

Finals

Mixed doubles

Seeds

 Robert Blair / Imogen Bankier (champion)
 Max Schwenger / Carla Nelte (semifinals)
 Peter Kaesbauer / Isabel Herttrich (semifinals)
 Niclas Nohr / Sara Thygesen (finals)
 Toby Ng / Alex Bruce (quarterfinals)
 Jonathan Nordh / Emelie Fabbeke (second round)
 Ronan Labar / Emilie Lefel (quarterfinals)
 Gaetan Mittelheisser / Audrey Fontaine (quarterfinals)

Finals

References

External links
 Tournament information at archive.org
 Tournament draw at tournamentsoftware.com

Scottish Open (badminton)
BWF Grand Prix Gold and Grand Prix
Scottish Open Grand Prix
Scottish Open Grand Prix